Ralf Kelleners (born 18 May 1968 in Dinslaken) is a racing driver from Germany.

His father Helmut Kelleners was also a racing driver, winning the Spa 24 Hours and the 24 Hours Nürburgring.

24 Hours of Le Mans results

External links
Official site

1968 births
Living people
German racing drivers
24 Hours of Le Mans drivers
American Le Mans Series drivers
European Le Mans Series drivers
Porsche Supercup drivers
24 Hours of Daytona drivers

Toyota Gazoo Racing drivers
Porsche Motorsports drivers
Rahal Letterman Lanigan Racing drivers
GT4 European Series drivers
Porsche Carrera Cup Germany drivers